Golden Boy (full title Art Blakey & The Jazz Messengers Play Selections From the New Musical Golden Boy) is a 1963 album by Art Blakey and the Jazz Messengers, performing compositions by Lee Adams and Charles Strouse written for the Broadway musical Golden Boy. The LP was originally released on the Colpix label.

Reception

Allmusic awarded the album 2 stars.

Track listing 
All compositions by Lee Adams and Charles Strouse
 "Theme from Golden Boy" - 5:35   
 "Yes I Can" - 5:25   
 "Lorna's Here" - 5:09   
 "This Is the Life" - 5:56   
 "There's a Party" - 5:00   
 "I Want to Be with You" - 4:03

Personnel 
Art Blakey - drums
Freddie Hubbard, Lee Morgan - trumpet 
Curtis Fuller - trombone, arranger
Julius Watkins - French horn
Bill Barber - tuba
James Spaulding - alto saxophone
Wayne Shorter - tenor saxophone, arranger
Charles Davis - baritone saxophone
Cedar Walton - piano, arranger
Reggie Workman - bass

References 

Art Blakey albums
The Jazz Messengers albums
1964 albums
Colpix Records albums